The men's long jump event at the 2018 African Championships in Athletics was held on 2 August in Asaba, Nigeria.

Results

References

2018 African Championships in Athletics
Long jump at the African Championships in Athletics